Neel Mukherjee, FRSL (born 1970) is an Indian English-language writer based in London. He is the author of several critically acclaimed novels. He is also the brother of famous television anchor and editor Udayan Mukherjee.

His first novel, Past Continuous won the Vodafone-Crossword Book Award in 2008 and several more awards when republished in the U.K. in 2010. His second novel, The Lives of Others was shortlisted for the 2014 Man Booker Prize and won the Encore Award. He was elected a Fellow of the Royal Society of Literature in 2018.

Life 
Mukherjee was educated at Don Bosco School, Park Circus, Kolkata. He studied English at Jadavpur University and then attended University College, Oxford, on a Rhodes Scholarship, where he studied English and graduated in 1992. He completed his Ph.D. at Pembroke College, Cambridge, and graduated with an M.A. degree in creative writing from the University of East Anglia in 2001.

He reviews fiction for a variety of publication in the UK and US, including The Times and Time Asia.

Describing the unexpected ease with which he wrote The Lives of Others, he said of the process:

Books

Past Continuous or A Life Apart
Published in India in January 2008 as Past Continuous. Republished in the U.K. in January 2010 as A Life Apart
 2008 Vodafone Crossword Book Award, English Fiction
 2009 GQ (India) Writer of the Year Award
 2011 DSC Prize for South Asian Literature shortlist
 Writers' Guild of Great Britain Award for best fiction
 "the saga of a lonely young gay man who flees a miserable life in Kolkata to the freedom of Britain"

The Lives of Others
Published in May 2014
2014 Encore Award from the Royal Society of Literature for the best second novel
2014 Man Booker Prize shortlist
2016 DSC Prize for South Asian Literature shortlist

Set in Calcutta in 1967. Idealistically motivated Supratik has become associated with extremist political activism. He disappears, leaving only a note. The life and fortunes of the family he has left behind take a disastrous turn, mirrored in the society around them.

A State of Freedom
The prologue was published in Granta 130.

References

Further reading

External links 
 
 Profile at the British Council
 Neel Mukherjee at Penguin India

1970 births
Living people
21st-century Indian male writers
21st-century Indian novelists
Alumni of Pembroke College, Cambridge
Alumni of the University of East Anglia
Alumni of University College, Oxford
Bengali Hindus
Don Bosco schools alumni
English-language writers from India
Indian male novelists
Indian Rhodes Scholars
Jadavpur University alumni
Novelists from West Bengal
Writers from Kolkata